Felgenhauer is a German surname and means wheelwright. Notable people with the surname include:

 Daniel Felgenhauer (born 1976), German footballer
 Pavel Felgenhauer (born 1951), Russian journalist
 Tatyana Felgenhauer (born 1985), Russian journalist

See also 
 Felger

References

German-language surnames